Carrie Chase Davis (13 August 1863 – 22 March 1953) was an American physician and suffragist. After teaching for some years, she graduated with a Medical Degree from Howard University College of Medicine in 1897, with a specialization in  Bacteriology. She was one of the leading women practitioners of the Western Reserve and was also prominent as a woman suffragist of the west. Davis served as secretary of the Erie County Medical Society, and recording secretary of the Ohio Woman Suffrage Association.

Early years and education
Carrie Chase Davis was born August 13, 1863, on a farm near Castalia, Ohio. She was a daughter of Thomas Robert and Sarah Ann (Chase) Davis. Her father was a native of New York, born February 14, 1824, and became well known as a leading farmer and stock raiser near Sandusky, Ohio. His home was one of the best known stations on the Underground Railroad between the United States and Canada. He was a highly educated man, a student of Oberlin College and a Congregationalist with wide influence. Sarah Ann Chase was born near Castalia, September 13, 1841, and after her marriage to Thomas Robert Davis, October 20, 1859, became the mother of two children, of whom Dr. Davis was the elder. The other daughter, May Davis, a physician, was born at Castalia, April 5. 1866. Her grandparents were Henry Nichols Chase and Mary Chapman Waller Chase; and Dr. Thomas Davis and Mary Avery Davis.

The Davis family left Ohio in 1868, settling at Bloomington, Illinois, so that the daughters could have good school advantages. For nine years, Davis obtained her early education at Normal, Illinois, where her mother died in 1875. The father then took his daughters to Missouri, where they grew up at Unionville. Davis attended and graduated (1884) from Normal School and Business Institute, at Stanberry, Missouri. In 1885 and 1886, she attended the State Normal School, Emporia, Kansas.

Career
Davis and her sister became successful in the educational field. In 1887, DAvis took up a homestead in Trego County, Kansas; making a final proof on the property, March 4, 1893. During these six years, she taught in the schools and teachers' institutes of Trego, Brown, and Sheridan counties. 

In 1893, Davis removed to Washington, D.C. where she attended Howard University Medical College, sessions 26, 27, 28, 29, 1893–7, and graduated M. D. in 1897. She practiced medicine in Washington until December, 1897, when she gained experience as a resident physician at Lying in Charity Hospital, Philadelphia, Pennsylvania, in 1898. After her graduation from that program in 1899, she removed to Sandusky, where she commenced her medical practice. For the next decade, she steadily progressed professionally, and also became widely recognized as a champion of women's rights, especially in the matter of obtaining the privilege of suffrage. 

Davis was a leading member of the Erie County Medical Society, of which she was secretary, and was also actively identified with the Ohio State and the American Medical Associations. Her prominence as a suffragist was further indicated by the fact that for a number of years, she held the position of recording secretary of the Ohio Woman Suffrage Association. She was president of the Civic Club of Sandusky, a member of the board of managers of the Rest Room, and a member of the Daughters of the American Revolution. In religion, Davis belonged to the Congregational church.

She died in Tennessee, 22 March 1953, and willed her body to Vanderbilt University School of Medicine.

References

Attribution
 
 
 

1863 births
1953 deaths
Physicians from Ohio
Howard University College of Medicine alumni
American suffragists
People from Erie County, Ohio
Daughters of the American Revolution people